is a Prefectural Natural Park on the southern border of Kagawa Prefecture, Japan. Established in 1992, the park comprises two non-contiguous areas of the Sanuki Mountains.

See also
 National Parks of Japan
 Setonaikai National Park

References

Parks and gardens in Kagawa Prefecture
Protected areas established in 1992
Takamatsu, Kagawa
Mannō, Kagawa